The Revolutionary Cultural Eastern Hearths  (Devrimci Doğu Kültür Ocakları, DDKO) were an association of mainly  Kurdish students in Turkey. It was formed in 1969 and forbidden after the military coup in 1971.

History 

In the late 1960s, Kurdish students organized so-called Eastern Meetings (Turkish:Doğu Mitingleri) which in 1969 lead to the foundation of the Revolutionary Cultural Eastern Hearths. The DDKO was initially present in Ankara and Istanbul, where Abdullah Öcalan took part in their activities. But soon spread its activities to cities in the Kurdish provinces, branches were established in Ergani in November 1970, a month later in Silvan and Kozluk and in January 1971 in Diyarbakır and Batman. The DDKO received relevant support of the left-wing Turkish Workers' Party (TIP) whose president Mehmet Ali Aslan was a Kurd and in 1969 has condemned a decree of the year 1967 prohibiting the distribution of foreign material in the Kurdish language.

Ideology and aims 
The DDKO organized further meetings and demanded a better development of the Eastern Provinces and also more cultural freedom. The DDKO was very much involved with the society and also published demands the farmers made in their journals. It was a left wing organization as it was involved in organizing in seminars about Marxism and socialism. But later also it also organized meetings where the Kurdish question was discussed. In several of their events and gatherings, short theater plays were performed in the Kurdish language.

Closure and prosecution 
In October 1970, many prominent leaders of the DDKO were arrested and after the military coup in March 1971, the DDKO was closed down. Then the DDKO trials began which were held under martial law. The prosecutions arguments were that Kurds don't actually exist, and their language was in reality a Turkish dialect. He argued that Kurdish was in its vast  a mixture of 60% of Turkish and 40% Arabic and Persian words. Therefore Kurdish was just as Turkic as Yakut or Chuvash. Further he accused the DDKO to have had ties with the left wing of the political party TIP and the Revolutionary Youth Federation of Turkey (Dev-Genç) which shall have led to separatist activities and violence that caused the Military to announce Martial law in 11 provinces. 

Musa Anter, Necmettin Büyükkaya and İsmail Beşikçi prepared their defenses. The defendants argued that Kurds existed and lived in Eastern Anatolia since 2000 B.C., while the Turks only arrived in Anatolia in the 11th century. They also argued that Kurdish is an Indo-European language while Turkish is an Altai-Uralic language. The Military tribunal attempted to impede such a defense, for it eventually could be seen as an argument which would be able to be used in the future, but in the end the defense was admitted and included to the case files. Many of the defendants were sentenced to over 10 years in prison.

Aftermath 
Some former DDKO members attempted to create a successor with the Devrimci Doğu Kültür Derneği (DDKD) but did not have success.

References 

Organizations established in 1969
1969 establishments in Turkey
Organizations disestablished in 1971
1971 disestablishments in Turkey